The 2015 Trenton Freedom season was the second season for the American indoor football franchise, and their second in the Professional Indoor Football League (PIFL).

Schedule
Key:

Regular season
All start times are local to home team

Standings

Roster

Trenton Freedom
Trenton Freedom
Trenton Freedom